Ulua is a genus of trevallies in the family Carangidae. They are native to the Indian Ocean and the western Pacific Ocean.

Species
There are currently two recognized species in this genus:

References

External links

 
Caranginae
Marine fish genera
Fish of the Indian Ocean
Fish of the Pacific Ocean
Marine fauna of East Africa
Taxa named by David Starr Jordan
Taxa named by John Otterbein Snyder